ShanghaiPRIDE Film Festival (ShPFF), is an annual LGBT film festival held in Shanghai, China. It was first established in 2015.

ShanghaiPRIDE Film Festival is one of three unconnected LGBT film festivals in the city. Shanghai Queer Film Festival, launched in September 2017, is a volunteer-run, not-for-profit event, and aims to help facilitate and promote the work of filmmakers from Chinese and other Asian backgrounds. CINEMQ, launched in 2015, is a volunteer-run, not-for-profit collective, focused on queer short film from Asia and around the world.

Other Chinese-language LGBT film festivals in the region, which also feature international LGBT films with Chinese subtitles, include Beijing Queer Film Festival, Hong Kong Lesbian & Gay Film Festival and Taiwan International Queer Film Festival.

Background
ShanghaiPRIDE Film Festival was established by filmmakers and people involved in the Shanghai arts scene, in conjunction with ShanghaiPRIDE, an LGBT group itself established to highlight a range of LGBT issues. ShanghaiPRIDE Film Festival was, in turn, established to create awareness and promote tolerance for the LGBT community through film. It was launched in 2015 to support new queer Chinese filmmaking talent. It also hosts workshops, Q & A Sessions and panel discussions with some of the leading figures in Chinese LGBT cinema. The festival takes place in June every year as part of ShanghaiPRIDE. Screenings are free and open to all.

History
ShanghaiPRIDE festival, launched in 2008, has always featured film screenings. PRIDE director Raymond Phang states: “screenings were very secretive – very small-scale, with 20 or 30 people at most. You wouldn’t know the venue until a few hours before.” According to Variety, foreign consulates provided financial support for the screening fees of certain titles, venues, and often their own cultural section’s libraries of LGBT-related titles from 2010.

A formal, fully fledged film festival was founded in 2015 by Matthew Baren and Alvin Li. Baren is a Shanghai-based filmmaker, while Li is an LGBT volunteer who lives in the US and China.

ShanghaiPRIDE Film Festival first opened from June 12–21, 2015. The first festival was themed, 'Queer Family,' and featured film screenings, including live Q & A sessions and workshops. It also featured short films from around the world, and invited submissions from Chinese LGBT filmmakers. The festival opened with the Mainland Chinese premiere of Lilting (2014) and opening night was attended by the film's star, actress Cheng Pei Pei.

The 2016 festival was held June 17–26, with the theme 'gender,' with a program of films on gender minorities. The 10 day event featured 40 films, a short film competition, workshops and panel discussions. The festival opened with the Mainland Chinese premiere of Tangerine (2015) Other highlights included a specially recorded message from Sir Ian McKellen, and a 20th anniversary screening of East Palace West Palace, attended by director Zhang Yuan.

The festival includes a short film competition, for films which 'tell stories of Chinese LGBTQ experience.' According to festival director and programmer Matthew Baren, "Film is very important to the LGBT movement in China. So much of [LGBTQ cinema] is dominated by the West. We wanted to support Chinese stories, Chinese faces." Five awards are judged by film industry professionals. Past judges have included filmmakers Hong Khaou, Quentin Lee and Kit Hung, as well as musicians Erica Lee and MIIIA. The top prize includes being presented at the internationally well-established Iris Prize and a chance for film producers to win funding for their forthcoming production.

Baren departed the festival in 2016, and was succeeded by Wing Shen for its 2017 edition. The 2017 festival will be a much smaller event, taking place on two non-consecutive days. It will be held on 11 and 18 June 2017. In 2019, the festival was directed by Raymond Phang, a Malaysian who is also the overall director of ShanghaiPRIDE festival.

See also
 List of LGBT film festivals

References

2015 establishments in China
Annual events in Shanghai
Festivals in Shanghai
LGBT film festivals in China
Film festivals established in 2015
Film festivals in China
Tourist attractions in Shanghai
LGBT culture in Shanghai
LGBT events in the People's Republic of China